Karūnava (formerly) is a village in Kėdainiai district municipality, in Kaunas County, in central Lithuania. According to the 2011 census, the village had a population of 54 people.

History 
The first mention of Karūnava (as Kralinowe) is known from "Livonian Chronicle" of Hermann von Wartberge, written in 1392.

At the end of the 19th there was Karūnava village and manor (a property of the Statkowski family).

Demography

References

Villages in Kaunas County
Kėdainiai District Municipality